Richardson High School (RHS) is a magnet high school in Richardson, Texas, United States with approximately 2,770 students and a student/teacher ratio of approximately 15:1 in the 20182019 school year. It is the oldest high school in the Richardson Independent School District (RISD).

Richardson High School is the flagship high school of the Richardson Independent School District (RISD). The school has many magnet programs, such as culinary arts, theater, visual arts, tech theater, communications, robotics, law, science, and computer science. The school also has award-winning mock trial, debate, and computer science teams.

History
The school, which opened shortly after the first public school in the city was burned down by Ross Inman in 1890, began in a two-room building on Old Pike Road, a street that is now part of Greenville Avenue. A rural school with fewer than 100 students up to 1950, the school opened its present facility in 1961. During the period of the late 1950s, RHS shared facilities with Westwood Junior High School on Abrams Road. Bill Passmore was principal during this transition into the new facility on Belt Line Road.

Jeremy Wade Delle suicide
On January 8, 1991, Jeremy Wade Delle, a 15-year-old sophomore, fatally shot himself in front of his second-period English class. The incident inspired the Pearl Jam song "Jeremy".

Brent Archie scandal
On July 30, 2008, teacher and coach Brent Archie was arrested on charges of having relationships with three female students. Archie was a football and wrestling coach, and also taught Advancement Via Individual Determination (AVID) and world history. This was the first incident of its kind in RISD history.

Athletics
Richardson's sports mascot is the Eagle; students, teachers, and alumni are referred to as Eagles; and the team shares Eagle-Mustang Stadium (capacity 12,000) with West Junior High School.

The school was the University Interscholastic League State Champions for Men's & Woman's Soccer in 1985.

Notable accomplishments 
The school was recognized as a National Blue Ribbon School in the 198384 school year.

In August 2006, Richardson High School was named one of three "best practices" high schools in the state of Texas. The award granted by the National Council of Educational Accountability and the Just 4 Kids Foundation is based upon staff development, staff retention, standardized test scores and support programs for students.

In May 2007, the RISD was awarded the "Excellence in Education Award for Large School District in Texas" by the HEB Foundation. Richardson High School and Richardson West Junior High played instrumental roles in the selection process and hosted the site visit committee in March 2007. In addition to the award, the RISD received a check for $100,000.

In the 2012 U.S. News & World Report rankings of the Best Schools in America, Richardson High School ranked number 711 out of 21,766 public high schools, putting it in the top 3.5% of all public high schools in the United States. RHS was also rated the 65th best in the state of Texas.

In 2015, 2016, and 2017, Richardson High School was one of the few hundred schools in the state of Texas, and the only high school in RISD to earn all 7 distinctions in the STAAR state assessment.

Media 
In 2009, the school's student news team started a public, student-written magazine known as The Talon.

KRET-TV 

In 1960 the Richardson Independent School District established KRET, the first TV station in the nation to be owned by a school district. The studio was located at Richardson High from 1963–1970. The studio was previously located at Richardson Junior High School (1960–1963). The station was converted on August 31, 1970, into a closed-circuit network named "TAGER".

References

External links

 

High schools in Richardson, Texas
Richardson Independent School District high schools
Magnet schools in Texas
Educational institutions established in 1890
1890 establishments in Texas